Events from the year 1936 in Canada.

Incumbents

Crown 
 Monarch – George V (until January 20) then Edward VIII (January 20 to December 11) then George VI

Federal government 
 Governor General – John Buchan
 Prime Minister – William Lyon Mackenzie King
 Chief Justice – Lyman Poore Duff (British Columbia)
 Parliament – 18th (from 6 February)

Provincial governments

Lieutenant governors 
Lieutenant Governor of Alberta – William Legh Walsh (until October 1) then Philip Primrose  
Lieutenant Governor of British Columbia – John W.F. Johnson (until May 1) then Eric Hamber
Lieutenant Governor of Manitoba – William Johnston Tupper  
Lieutenant Governor of New Brunswick – Murray MacLaren  
Lieutenant Governor of Nova Scotia – Walter Harold Covert 
Lieutenant Governor of Ontario – Herbert Alexander Bruce 
Lieutenant Governor of Prince Edward Island – George Des Brisay de Blois 
Lieutenant Governor of Quebec – Esioff-Léon Patenaude 
Lieutenant Governor of Saskatchewan – Hugh Edwin Munroe (until September 10) then Archibald Peter McNab

Premiers 
Premier of Alberta – William Aberhart    
Premier of British Columbia – Thomas Dufferin Pattullo 
Premier of Manitoba – John Bracken 
Premier of New Brunswick – Allison Dysart 
Premier of Nova Scotia – Angus Lewis Macdonald
Premier of Ontario – Mitchell Hepburn 
Premier of Prince Edward Island – Walter Lea (until January 10) then Thane Campbell (from January 14)  
Premier of Quebec – Louis-Alexandre Taschereau (until June 11) then Adélard Godbout (June 11 to August 26) then Maurice Duplessis 
Premier of Saskatchewan – William John Patterson

Territorial governments

Commissioners 
 Controller of Yukon – George A. Jeckell 
 Commissioner of Northwest Territories – Vacant (Roy A. Gibson acting) (until December 3) then Charles Camsell

Events
January 6 - Barbara Hanley is elected mayor of Webbwood, Ontario, becoming the first female mayor in Canada
January 14 - Thane Campbell becomes premier of Prince Edward Island, replacing Walter Lea
April 12 - The Moose River Gold Mines collapse
June 11 - Adélard Godbout becomes premier of Quebec, replacing Louis-Alexandre Taschereau
August 26 - Maurice Duplessis becomes premier of Quebec, replacing Adélard Godbout
September - Earl Bascom of Raymond, Alberta, designs and directs the construction of the first rodeo arena and grandstands in the state of Mississippi
November 2 - The Canadian Broadcasting Corporation replaces the Canadian Radio Broadcasting Commission
November 18 - The Toronto Globe and the Mail and Empire merge to form The Globe and Mail
December 11 - The British Parliament passes His Majesty's Declaration of Abdication Act 1936 which legislates the abdication of King Edward VIII.
The Spanish Civil War begins. Eventually, 1135 Canadians will serve in the International Brigades of the Republican forces
 Quebec Premier Maurice Duplessis hangs a crucifix in the Legislative Assembly Chamber. It hung there for 83 years, until it was removed on 10 July 2019

Sport
April 13 - The Ontario Hockey Association's West Toronto Nationals win their only Memorial Cup by defeating the Saskatchewan Junior Hockey League's Saskatoon Wesleys 2 games to 0 
August 8 - Frank Amyot wins a gold medal in  canoeing, Men's C-1 1000 m at the 1936 Summer Olympics in Berlin
December 5 - The Sarnia Imperials win their second and final Grey Cup by defeating the Ottawa Rough Riders 26 to 20 in the 24th Grey Cup played at Varsity Stadium

Births

January to March
January 18 - Albert Driedger, politician
February 6 - Kent Douglas, ice hockey player and coach (d. 2009)
February 9 - Stompin' Tom Connors, folk singer (d. 2013)
February 18 - Ab McDonald, Canadian ice hockey player (d. 2018)
February 29 - Henri Richard, ice hockey player
March 1 - Monique Bégin, academic, politician and Minister
March 21 - Ed Broadbent, politician and political scientist
March 24 - David Suzuki, science broadcaster and environmental activist

April to June
April 17 - Peter Adams, politician
April 19 - Sharon Pollock, playwright, actress, and director (d. 2021)
May 14 
 Aline Chrétien, wife of Jean Chrétien (d. 2020)
 Richard John Neuhaus, churchman and author (d. 2009)
May 15 - Milan Kymlicka, arranger, composer and conductor (d. 2008)
May 31 - Tony Pajaczkowski, football player (d. 2022)
June 21 - Joseph Gosnell, Nisga'a statesman
June 26 
Herbert Obst, fencer 
 Jean-Claude Turcotte, cardinal (d. 2015)
June 30 - Alan Hamel, entertainer, producer and television host

July to December
July 3 - Larry Condon, politician (d. 1991)
July 9 - André Pronovost, ice hockey player
July 13 - Sandor Stern, writer, director and film producer
July 25 - August Schellenberg, actor (d. 2013)
July 28 - Russ Jackson, football player
August 20 - David MacDonald, politician and author
September 26 - Lowell Murray, Senator
October 9 – Don Wittman, sportscaster (d. 2008)
October 27 - Suzanne Paradis, writer
November 7 - Audrey McLaughlin, politician
December 16 - Karleen Bradford, children's author

Full date unknown
Greg Curnoe, painter (d. 1992)
Sheldon Turcott, journalist (d. 2000)

Deaths
January 8 - John Augustus Barron, politician and lawyer (b. 1850)
January 10 - Walter Lea, politician and Premier of Prince Edward Island (b. 1874)
January 20 - George V, King of Canada (b. 1865)
January 22 - Noah Timmins, mining developer and executive (b. 1867)
February 26 - Frederick C. Alderdice, businessman, politician and last Prime Minister of Newfoundland (b. 1871)
May 7 - Isidore-Noël Belleau, politician and lawyer (b. 1848)
May 30 - Homer Watson, artist (b. 1855)
June 18 - Edith Jane Miller, concert contralto singer (b. 1875)
July 6 - Peter Veniot, businessman, newspaper owner, politician and 17th Premier of New Brunswick (b. 1863)
October 3 - William Parks, geologist and paleontologist (b. 1868)
October 29 - Tobias Norris, politician and 10th Premier of Manitoba (b. 1861)

See also
 List of Canadian films

Historical documents
Saying "I hate war," President Roosevelt seeks foreign and economic policies that will encourage peace

Threatening embargo on Canadian liquor, U.S.A. demands back taxes and customs duties for liquor smuggled during Prohibition

"Taxes are urgently needed" - Alberta's Two Rivers School District board cajoles ratepayers in arrears

Seventy-year-old woman talks to enough of Yukon's 1,805 voters to be elected to House of Commons

"Sterilization is proposed[...]as logical humane procedure to limit the reproduction of the mentally defective."

Vancouver business groups testify that limiting employment of "orientals" on Canadian ships may curtail or cancel service

Governor General Lord Tweedsmuir expresses his deep regret to King Edward VIII on his abdication

"A commission of three cannot[...]execute policies" - House committee calls for corporation to replace Canadian Radio Commission

"We in Canada are sound asleep in flying matters," says Air Vice-Marshall Billy Bishop

Canadian Tuberculosis Association urges more clinics for Indigenous people, who suffer 30% of TB deaths in western Canada

Youth organizations ranging from church groups to Young Communist League unite for reform at 1936 Youth Congress

Stephen Leacock's views of travel writing and Port Arthur (Thunder Bay), Ont.

Ralph J. Gleason praises Canadian hockey while covering college tournament for Columbia University student newspaper

Setting new record for one-mile event, Canadian race walker wins in New York City

References

 
Years of the 20th century in Canada
Canada
1936 in North America